Mirrors is the debut full-length studio album by Hong Kong singer and rapper Jackson Wang. It was released by his own label, Team Wang and Western and 6th, on October 25, 2019. "Bullet to the Heart" and "Dway!" served as the album's lead singles.

Background
On September 12, 2019, Wang held a listening session of his first album Mirrors for the press: the digital record, which expresses the emotions of the contemporary youth and incorporates elements of China's traditional culture, was produced in China, South Korea, and the United States. Wang supervised the whole process, from the initial creation to the packaging, and was personally involved in arrangements, lyrics writing, and music video shooting. The album features the Chinese version of Stephanie Poetri's "I Love You 3000" and seven tracks in English, among which "Faded" was supposed to be released as a standalone single in March 2019.

In an interview with i-D, Wang stated "For this album I actually found my true identity. I've released a lot of rap songs in the past; In China I release many ballads and R&B songs, so it just came to a conclusion where I felt like the fusion of it all was me." Through Mirrors, he shares his truest and deepest feelings, talking about love, running out of time, his achievements and where he is in life. Although the songs' main theme looks like romantic love, the counterpart he sings about is himself, his demons, fears, or his passions.

The album's first single, "Bullet to the Heart", was released on September 24 and is about overcoming the obstacles and hardships experienced while pursuing a dream. The album's second single was "Dway!", published on October 22, and expresses Wang's pride towards his achievements and his conviction that he's able to master his life. The title is a word play with the Chinese word "对", which means "I'm right". The full album was released on October 25, 2019 along with a music video for "Titanic", a collaboration song with Indonesian singer and rapper Rich Brian. In the music video, Wang dances with Asian dance group Kinjaz.

Critical reception 

About the album, Clash said "Jackson Wang's solo career is set to truly shine. [...] What's most impressive about the record [...] is the brilliant range of distinct sounds the young artist has managed to cover in eight short tracks; no track sounds like another and that sets the bar really high for whatever he comes out with next. Connections of the heart, the career he has worked for and his conviction in seeing himself through the hard journey, and a celebration of his Asian culture to boot, makes up Jackson Wang's debut album – and it's hard to find any glaring faults with it barring the slow start of the first few tracks and a wish that the record was longer than just a total of 20 minutes." It also indicated "Titanic" as the highlight of the record.

Jeff Benjamin from Billboard wrote "The album's title of Mirrors is a perfect fit as an album shooting a real, sometimes harsh, reflection of one's true self. It's a change-up from the previously announced Journey to the West title Jackson was previously playing, as these eight songs all look to be a larger meditation on Wang as a human rather than about a crossover attempt. [...] One of Mirror's standout tracks "Bad Back" shines as one of the most interesting on the album as it seems to have multiple layers to representing Jackson as both an artist and as a person" and "Mirrors felt like a journey of self-discovery with a tracklist that showcased new sides of Jackson as an artist."

Commercial performance
Upon its release, "Bullet to the Heart" debuted at #1 on the Billboard China Chart and peaked at #1 on the China Social Chart.

In the November 3–9 week, the album placed #32 on Billboard 200, becoming the highest-charting debut album ever from a Chinese artist. In the same week, it also debuted on other Billboard's charts: it placed #3 on Digital Albums Chart, #1 on Independent Albums Chart, #2 on Rap Album Sales Chart, #3 on Digital Albums Chart, #4 on Top Album Sales Chart and Top Current Albums Chart, #18 on Top Rap Albums Chart, and #22 on Top R&B/Hip-Hop Albums Chart.

Track listing
Credits adapted from NetEase Music.

Accolades

Charts

References

2019 debut albums
Hip hop albums by Chinese artists
Contemporary R&B albums by Chinese artists